Bruce C. Kone (born January 29, 1958) is an American professor, nephrologist and  molecular biologist. He is also a World Aquatics Masters Swimming world record holder, United States Masters Swimming (USMS) national record holder, twenty-three-time USMS national champion, and eight-time FINA Masters world's top-ranked age group swimmer. He is currently a tenured professor of medicine at the University of Texas Health Science Center at Houston (UTHealth).

Career 
A naturalized citizen of the United States, he was born in Frankfurt, Germany. He attended Pine Crest Preparatory School in Fort Lauderdale, Florida, where he was a scholar-athlete awardee, All-American swimmer, and selected to the Athletic Hall of Fame and the Arete Society. In 1979, he received his A.B. in English (cum laude) and captained the varsity swimming team at Princeton University. He then completed his M.D. (Honors in Research) at the University of Florida College of Medicine in 1983, a residency in internal medicine at the Johns Hopkins Hospital, Johns Hopkins University School of Medicine, and a nephrology fellowship at Brigham and Women's Hospital, Harvard Medical School.

Kone held faculty positions at the Johns Hopkins University School of Medicine (1989–91) and the University of Florida College of Medicine (1991–95) before joining the University of Texas Medical School at Houston (now known as the McGovern Medical School) in 1995. He was selected by Nobel Laureate Ferid Murad to be the inaugural chief of the division of clinical pharmacology (1998–99). Kone then went on to be director of the division of renal diseases and hypertension (2000–06), vice-chairman (2000–03) and then chairman (2004–07) of the department of internal medicine (2004–07), and inaugural holder of The James T. and Nancy B. Willerson Chair (2001–07) at that institution. He also served as the chief of nephrology (2000–06) and of internal medicine (2004–07) at Memorial Hermann - Texas Medical Center Hospital and chief of the section of nephrology at The University of Texas M.D. Anderson Cancer Center (2000–06). In 2007, at the age of 49, he became the youngest medical school dean in the United States when he was appointed the Folke H. Peterson/Dean's Distinguished Professor and eighth Dean of the University of Florida College of Medicine. As dean, he played a lead role in establishing a partnership between the University of Florida and the H. Lee Moffitt Cancer Center and Research Institute and Shands HealthCare for cancer care and research, and recruited an internationally regarded leader in cancer care and research, Joseph V. Simone, M.D., to lead the University of Florida and Shands Cancer Center. Kone also championed new clinical quality, access, and safety initiatives. During his tenure as dean, the number of clinical specialties at the UF-affiliated Shands Teaching Hospital recognized in the U.S. News & World Report rankings of "America's Best Hospitals" increased from 7 to 11, Shands Healthcare was selected for the Governor's Sterling Award for performance excellence, the UF Clinical and Translational Science Institute was established, and state funding to the University of Florida for medical education increased for the first time in seven years. Kone also championed diversity and gender equity, expanding the Office of Minority Affairs, appointing the first African-American as chairman of a department at the University of Florida College of Medicine, and appointing women to endowed professorships department chair, and associate dean positions.

Controversy 
In May 2008, University of Florida president J. Bernard Machen abruptly "relieved" Kone of his duties as Dean of the University of Florida College of Medicine amid controversy regarding Kone's decision --- publicly supported by Machen --- to override the medical selection committee and admit the son of a politically active physician who was personally recommended by Governor Charlie Crist and State Senate President Ken Pruitt,
which was disclosed when medical selection committee members illegally breached the accepted student's confidentiality to the press, (the student subsequently graduated from the UF College of Medicine and is a practicing physician) and Kone's objections regarding "deals" that had been struck by his predecessor C. Craig Tisher, M.D. and senior administrative officials to rehire senior administrators who had completed the Deferred Retirement Option Program (DROP), in particular the continued employment in an endowed position of senior associate dean Robert W. Watson, M.D. Kone defended his decision to override the medical selection committee in public statements, and in a letter to the editor of Academic Medicine. The University of Florida investigated the DROP matter and concluded that senior UF officials violated the spirit of a University policy by receiving DROP payouts to retire and then be rehired without searches for other candidates, in some cases also receiving perks such as bonuses and raises.  The report also concluded that Kone's refusal to honor the Watson agreement prevented violation of law. On June 18, 2009, Florida Governor Crist signed into law the "Double-dipping Reform Bill" to prevent state employees from simultaneously collecting retirement benefits and a salary. On June 30, 2009, Kone resigned from the University of Florida to return to the University of Texas Medical School at Houston and received a settlement award of $517,000 from the University of Florida Board of Trustees.

Honors 
He was President of the Southern Society of Clinical Investigation, and a member of the Leadership Council on the Kidney in Cardiovascular Disease of the American Heart Association.

He has served as an associate editor of Clinical and Translational Science, and a member of the editorial boards of the American Journal of Physiology. Renal Physiology, the American Journal of Physiology. Endocrinology and Metabolism, the Journal of the American Society of Nephrology, Kidney International, the American Journal of Medicine, and the World Journal of Biological Chemistry. Kone has served on the Florida Tobacco Education and Use Prevention Advisory Council of the Florida Department of Health, the Board of the Memorial Hermann Healthcare System Physicians of Texas, Houston, Texas, and was president and Chairman of the University of Florida Proton Therapy Institute. He is a past member of the Public Policy Committee of the American College of Clinical Pharmacology. He was selected by his peers to "Best Doctors in America" 2005-2019 and to Marquis "Who's Who In America" and "Who's Who in the World" in 2009 - 2019, and "Who's Who in Science and Engineering" in 2010 - 2016.  In 2016, he was elected to the Academy of Master Educators at the McGovern Medical School at The University of Texas Health Science Center at Houston.  Kone is also recognized as an American record holder (2014, 2015, 2018, 2019), All-American (2010, 2013-2022), Pool All-Star (2014, 2019), and twenty-six time national age group champion in United States Masters Swimming. He co-held a FINA Masters first-place ranking in the world in 2013,  garnered two first place world rankings in 2014, one first place world ranking in 2015, 2016, and 2018-2021.

References

1958 births
Living people
Princeton Tigers men's swimmers
American nephrologists
University of Florida College of Medicine alumni
Johns Hopkins School of Medicine alumni
Harvard Medical School people
Johns Hopkins Hospital physicians
Johns Hopkins University faculty
University of Florida faculty
University of Texas Health Science Center at Houston faculty
American molecular biologists